Brett Sullivan is a London-based Australian-British filmmaker. Born in Sydney, Australia, 1971, Sullivan formed production company Steam Motion and Sound with Julian Chow in 1996. Steam established a UK office in 2003, and a New York office in 2014 with co-founder Clayton Jacobsen.

Sullivan has directed and produced music videos/TV specials for Phil Collins, Michael Bublé, Natalie Merchant, James Blunt, Robert Plant, Seal, Bette Midler, Ben Folds, Katherine Jenkins, LP, Gnarls Barkley, Rumer, Idina Menzel, Birdy, Nile Rodgers, Pablo Alboran, Josh Groban, Lenny Kravitz and Eric Clapton.

International commercials and campaigns for Madonna, REM, Linkin Park, Flaming Lips, Alicia Keys, Andre Rieu, Jason DeRulo, Josh Groban, Bruno Mars, Jill Scott, Alfie Boe, Roland Villazon, Lenny Kravitz, Regina Spektor, Justice, My Chemical Romance, Robert Plant, Ed Sheeran, Nickelback, David Gray, Muse, KD Lang, Green Day, Red Hot Chili Peppers, Rihanna, Josh Radin, Ray LaMontagne, Plan B. Other commercial and branding work includes Deezer, Vodafone, Pepsi, Reebok, Orange, Adidas, Ikea, Coca-Cola.

He has directed and produced filmed theatrical productions in the West End, Broadway, Canada, Germany and Australia for Les Misérables, Hamilton, Phantom of the Opera, Miss Saigon, Aladdin, A Strange Loop, Newsies, The Lion King, Billy Elliot, Frozen The Musical, The Rockettes, Singin in the Rain, Waitress, Beauty and the Beast, Get Up Stand Up, Jesus Christ Superstar, Oliver, Charlie and the Chocolate Factory, Wicked, Pippin, Dirty Dancing, Mary Poppins, Sister Act, The Prince of Egypt, Jersey Boys, Love Never Dies, Spring Awakening, Buddy Holly, Ghost, Richard III, An American in Paris, Shrek, Bring It On and War Horse. Billy Elliot The Musical Live was the first live event cinema release to top the UK box office and set a new box office record for live event cinema. Sullivan's next live film Miss Saigon has since set a new record for event cinema in the UK. In the USA, Disney's Newsies Live! set a new box office record for a live musical event at the cinema.

Sullivan was a co-founder of Adstream (2001), digital media and asset management company for advertising agencies. It is located in 17 countries.

Film Director
Waitress on Broadway - TBD - Namco - in post production 
The Prince of Egypt - 2023 - Live in London - Universal Pictures International - in post production 
Aladdin - Live in London - Disney Theatrical Group - Disney+ - Release 2023
Kinky Boots - 2019 - Live in London - BroadwayHD - Cinema 
Newsies - 2017 - Live in Hollywood - Disney Theatrical Group - Cinema/Disney+ 
Tour Stop 148 - Michael Bublé  - 2016 - Warner Bros Records - Cinema/Home Video
Miss Saigon - Live in London - 2016 - Universal Pictures/Cameron Mackintosh - Cinema/Home Video 
Billy Elliot The Musical - 2014 - Live in London - Universal Pictures/Working Title Films - Cinema/Home Video
Love Never Dies - 2014 - Feature - Universal Pictures / Really Useful Group - Cinema/Home Video 
Special When Lit, Feature Documentary 2010, Best Documentary United Los Angeles Film Festival, Nominated Best Documentary Raindance, Official Selection at Calgary international Film Festival, Vancouver International Film Festival, Atlanta International Documentary Film Festival, Hot Springs Documentary Festival, Buffalo Niagara International Film Festival, Bronx International Film Festival, Indianapolis international Film Festival, New York United Film Festival, London United Film Festival, Wisconsin Film Festival, Tallahassee Film Festival, Big Sky Documentary Film Festival. Aired in USA on Documentary Channel 2011, aired in the UK on PBS 2011.

Film Producer
Heathers The Musical - 2022 - Village Roadshow / BK Studios / Roku 
Bonnie and Clyde Musical Live in London - 2022 - in post production - David Treatman Creative
Jesus Christ Superstar Arena Tour - Universal Pictures - DVD
The Phantom of the Opera at the Royal Albert Hall - Universal Pictures - Cinema/DVD
Les Misérables 25th Anniversary Concert Live The O2 - Universal Pictures - Cinema/DVD

Selected Music Work
Director - Michael Bublé - Cry Me A River, Crazy Love, Santa Claus Is Coming To Town, To Love Somebody, You Make Me Feel So Young
Director - School of Rock The Musical - You're in the Band - 360 Video
Director - Seal - Everytime I'm With You, Do You Ever
Director - Hamilton - Alexander Hamilton featuring Lin-Manuel Miranda - in 3D for Hamilton Exhibition. Co-directed with Thomas Kail
Director - Emin featuring Nile Rodgers - Boomerang, Baby Get Higher, Got Me Good, Let Me Go featuring Robin Schulz 
Director - Greg Holden - Boys In The Street
Director - Pablo Alborán - Recuérdame
Director - Idina Menzel& Michael Bublé - Baby, It's Cold Outside
Director - Robert Plant - Rainbow
Director - James Blunt - Satellites, Blue on Blue
Director - LP - Tokyo Sunrise
Co-Director Michael Bublé's Day Off - ITV/Warner Music
Co-Director with Marc Klasfeld - Michael Bublé - Close Your Eyes
Director - Josh Groban  - I Believe (When I Fall In Love), What I Did For Love, Somewhere Over the Rainbow
Director - Phil Collins  - Going Back, Heatwave
Director - A Conversation With Phil Collins TV Special
Director - Natalie Merchant - minidoc - Leave Your Sleep
Director - Natalie Merchant Live Session - Man In The Wilderness
Director - A Conversation with Michael Bublé TV Special
Director - Birdy - Birdy Live at The Chapel
Director - Katherine Jenkins - Angel
Producer -Eric Clapton EPK and A Conversation With Eric Clapton TV Special
Director - Donkeyboy - Ambitions
Director - Rumer - PF Sloan, Slow (International Version)
Director - Emin-  Baby Get Higher
Director - Gnarls Barkley - Crazy - Graphics version
Creative Director - International TV Campaigns for Bette Midler, It's The Girls!
Creative Director - International TV Campaigns for FUN., Some Nights
Creative Director - International TV Campaigns for Madonna 'Confessions on a Dancefloor', 'Hard Candy', 'Confessions Live'
Creative Director - International TV Campaigns for Michael Bublé 'Call Me Irresponsible', 'Caught In The Act', 'Crazy Love', 'Christmas', To Be Loved
Creative Director - International TV Campaigns for R.E.M. - Live, Accelerate, Collapse Into Now
Creative Director - International TV Campaigns for Green Day - American Idiot, Bullet In A Bible, 21st Century Breakdown, Awesome as F**K, Uno - Dos - Tres
Creative Director - International TV Campaigns for Red Hot Chili Peppers - Stadium Arcadium
Director - My Chemical Romance UK TV Campaign - Winner Best Music TV Commercial UKMVA's 2010
Producer - Robert Plant Band of Joy UK TV Campaign - Nominated Best Music TV Commercial UKMVA's 2010
Producer - David Garrett - Viva La Vida

Commercials Director
Beauty and the Beast - Disney Theatrical - UK
Deezer - International Commercial Campaign
Frozen The Musical - Trailer/Music Videos - Broadway+UK+Germany
Hamilton - Trailer - UK/Australia/USA/Hamilton Exhibition in 3D
The Rockettes - MSG - Commercials
School of Rock The Musical - Commercial/Trailer - UK/Broadway
Kinky Boots - Commercial/Trailer - UK
On Your Feet - Commercial - Broadway
Beautiful The Musical - Commercials - Broadway/UK
Miss Saigon - Commercials/Trailer - UK
The Curious Incident of the Dog in the Night-Time - UK
Aladdin - Commercials/Trailer - Broadway/UK
Strictly Ballroom The Musical- Commercials/Trailer - Australia
 Charlie and the Chocolate Factory Musical - Commercials/Promo - UK
 David Byrne and Fatboy Slim's Here Lies Love - Public Theater New York - Promo
Pippin - Commercials/Promo - USA
Hairspray - Commercials/Promo - UK Tour
Rocky The Musical - Commercials/Promo - Germany
Matilda - Commercials/Promo - USA and UK, Winner of Telly Awards
Bring It On - Commercials/Promo - USA
King Kong - Commercial - Australia
Shrek The Musical - Commercials/Promo - UK
Les Misérables - Commercials/Promo - UK, Broadway, Australia
Singin in the Rain - Commercials/Promo - UK
War Horse - Commercials/Promo - UK + USA - National Theatre
Bring It On - Commercials/Promo - Fox Theatricals - USA/Canada
Jesus Christ Superstar Broadway - Commercials/Promo - USA
Million Dollar Quartet - Commercials/Promo - UK
Les Misérables 25th Anniversary Tour - Commercials/Promo - UK/Spain/US
Oliver! - Commercial/Promo - UK
The Phantom of the Opera - Commercial/Promo - UK, Broadway
Wicked - Commercials/Promo - Germany/UK/Broadway
Dirty Dancing - TV Documentary, Commercials, EPKs - UK/US/Germany/Australia
The Lion King - Commercial/Promo - UK/US, Australia
Ghost the Musical - Commercial/Promo - UK
Mary Poppins - Commercials/Promo - Australia
Jersey Boys (London, Broadway) - Commercials/Promo - UK/US
Love Never Dies- Promo, Video Clip - UK
Buddy Holly - Promo - Germany
Spring Awakening - Commercials/Promo - UK
Richard III at the Old Vic - Commercials/Promo - UK

Other
The Last Word Musical - Sullivan wrote the book, music and lyrics for The Last Word, musical staged at the 2016 New York Musical Festival. The musical was directed by Michael Bello and Choreographed by Nick Kenkel. Additional lyrics by Ryan Cunningham. Nominated for Best Choreography, and Best Supporting Actress in the festival awards.
Sullivan played in Australian indie bands Broken Words, Mockingbird and Easy Brother.

References

External links

1971 births
Living people
Australian film directors
Australian music video directors
People from Sydney